The title of Lemon Capital of the World has been give to these places, for growing large amounts of lemons:

South Riverside Land and Water Company now Corona, California. (1887 to 1980s).
Chula Vista, California (1888 to present) 
Ventura County, California - Santa Paula, California - Saticoy, California (1938 to present) 
Florida
Mexico
India

Lemons need a minimum temperature of around 7 °C (45 °F), so the list is all places with mild winters.

See also
Citrus production
Citrus rootstock
List of citrus diseases
Mother Orange Tree

Gallery

References

Citrus production
City nicknames